John Ackland may refer to:

John Ackland (politician) (1890–1958), Australian politician
John Ackland (rugby league) (born 1958), rugby league coach, scout and former player for New Zealand

See also
Ackland